Na Yong is a district (amphoe) of Trang province, Thailand.

History
The minor district (king amphoe) Na Yong was established on 1 April 1990 by splitting off six tambons from Mueang Trang district. It was upgraded to a full district on 4 November 1993.

Geography
Neighboring districts are (from the south clockwise): Yan Ta Khao and Mueang Trang of Trang Province; Si Banphot and Srinagarindra of Phatthalung province.

Administration
The district is divided into six sub-districts (tambons), which are further subdivided into 53 villages (mubans). Na Yong Nuea is a township (thesaban tambon) which covers parts of tambon Na Yong Nuea. There are a further six tambon administrative organizations (TAO).

References

External links
amphoe.com

Districts of Trang province